National Movement (RN) is an ultranationalist political party in Poland. It is led by Robert Winnicki.

It was founded in 2012 as an organization, and in 2014 it was registered as a political party. It is a part of the Confederation Liberty and Independence, and it currently has 5 members in the Sejm. It is a far-right political party and it is orientated towards socially conservative and militarist stances.

National Congress Meetings
The First Congress of the National Movement took place on June 8, 2013 in Warsaw. Guest of honor at the congress was Rafał Ziemkiewicz. Representatives of the groups co-create the movement and signed the declaration of ideological National Movement.

The Second Congress of the National Movement took place May 3, 2014 in Warsaw. Honorary guests of the congress were Leszek Zebrowski, Stanislaw Michalkiewicz and Márton Gyöngyösi of the Hungarian Jobbik. Also the guest list included the party's other international allies: Roberto Fiore of Forza Nuova''', and the leaders of the Spanish Democracia Nacional. The congress passed the following demands of the program:

merging of income tax and social insurance contributions into one
elimination of pay-for-all social security system
"Citizen Retirement Programme" (providing a flat-rate pension, independent of earlier earnings and hours of work)
tax-free sum granted for each child in the family
reduction of income tax levied on micro, small and medium-sized businesses
restoration of turnover tax in lieu of corporate income tax
the establishment of a constitutional debt which limits public finances
full transparency of public finances (including contracts and salaries in the public sector)
modernization of the Polish Armed Forces
the introduction of a universal territorial defence unit and a watchtower in every borough
widen the access to weapons
ensure the constitution guarantees national ownership of Polish land
denunciation of the Treaty of Lisbon and replace it with a "Sovereignty Treaty"
termination of the energy-climate agreements and the European Fiscal Compact
promotion of Polish history in the world (including the fight against the term "Polish concentration camps")
public combat of the so-called "ideology of gender"
striving for energy independence (support for the extraction of shale gas and nuclear power plants)

Ideology
The National Movement is positioned on the far-right on the political spectrum. It has been described as an ultranationalist, Polish nationalist, and national-conservative party. It is explicitly socially conservative, and it has militarist tendencies. It has also expressed hard Eurosceptic sentiment.

 Program 
As adopted in the January 2013 declaration of ideology, the decision-making council of the National Movement has indicated its three main components: identity (nation, family, people), sovereignty (the state, culture, economy) and freedom (of speech, management, people); identified the awareness and commitment of the young generation of Poles as the strength of the National Movement and pledged to work on the transformation of the homeland, emphasized the idea of the nation, understood as a cultural community formed by generations. National Movement advocates fight for the sovereignty of the country, to repair the political and economic state and defending the freedom of its citizens, as well as the realisation in the sphere of culture and politics of traditional values. The purpose of the Movement is a fundamental social change - the so-called "Overthrow of the republic of the Round Table". It declares itself as a social movement which is a network of community initiatives for state sovereignty and national identity.

In the absence of hierarchical and organisational dependencies, the movement will be guided by the common symbols, and the demands of the electorate. One of the symbols is the image of the nationalist right, which formed in the struggle for Polish independence. For most of the activists of the Movement such symbols are also soldiers of the army of the underground National Armed Forces (NSZ), who fought during World War II and after the war against the German and Soviet occupation. The National Armed Forces, founded by the military part of the underground National Radical Camp in 1942, also declared obedience to submit to the Army. Among the soldiers of the National Armed Forces of the Supervisory Board sees its historical similarity and should continue to operate. Fundamental important dates to the Movement is the day commemorating the creation of the National Armed Forces attributable to 22 September, the anniversary of Captain Witold Pilecki's death sentence and 1 March - National Day of Remembrance "Soldiers accursed" (from 2011 official holiday) and attributable to the November 11 march Independence. National Movement is also trying to commemorate the anniversary of the imposition of martial law and the 1981 workers' uprising in Poznań in 1956.

National Movement, a coalition of independent groups, presents a conservative position on social issues. According to the program, decided at the second congress of 2014, the movement is traditional ally of the Catholic Church and will strive to uphold traditional Christian values. The movement also refers to the tradition and heritage of ancient Rome. The progress of civilisation, which was to take place in Poland thanks to EU funds, is treated as a partial compensation for the losses that Poland suffered in connection with the unilateral opening of the market in the pre-accession period, while Polish banking sector depends on foreign capital.

Economy
The outline of the economic program was presented by Krzysztof Bosak during the second congress of the Movement. According to the RN, it is possible to combine a wide range of economic freedoms with constructive approach to the state, furnished on the basis of the principles of thrift and subsidiarity. The establishment of the Institute for National Strategy, will bring together experts and work out a modern program for the National Movement.

The movement is opposed to the introduction of the euro in Poland.

Foreign policy
The National Movement is a eurosceptic grouping.

In a joint statement with the Hungarian Jobbik on the situation in Ukraine, they have indicated a desire to deepen cooperation between the two groups. They announced the Polish-Hungarian exchange of lists of candidates for election to the European Parliament in 2014 (which ultimately did not happen). Hungarian and Polish nationalists believe that national governments devote national interests in favour of eurofederalism. In this particular case, both national movements called together the national authorities of their countries for political and diplomatic efforts to protect the endangered rights of national minorities in Ukraine due to the revolutionary mood in the east, including promoting the symbolism and characters associated with the Ukrainian ethnic chauvinism that in the context of historical experience violently celebrated national minorities in these lands.

The National Movement initially wanted to improve relations with Russia, considering it as a superpower and claiming that it was not a threat to Poland on any level, as well as supporting the reconstruction of commercial relations with Russia. It also believed that the presence of allied NATO and American troops is "the reverse of allied support, which strengthens Poland's dependence and dependability in its defense capabilities". It instead proposed to work with Russia and China as an antidote to the influence of the United States and Germany, calling it a "multi-vector policy".

However, following critical Russian remarks regarding Polish conduct during the Second World War, the National Movement's stance has become more negative towards Russia. The party has disavowed the pro-Russian stance of its political ally Janusz Korwin-Mikke and condemned the Russian annexation of Crimea. The party has suggested Russia was coordinating with Israel, which has expressed similar criticisms of Polish conduct during the Second World War. Following the 2022 Russian invasion of Ukraine, Bosak called for banning Russia from SWIFT and stopping visas for Russian nationals. Winnicki has described Russia as an "existential threat to Polish interests".

LGBT rights
The party opposes same sex rights and pro-LGBT marches, and its leaders have described homosexuality as "a disease", frequently arranging counter demonstrations.

Participation in elections
Elections to the European Parliament in 2014

The National Movement announced their desire to take part in the elections to the European Parliament on the 7th January 2014 which were to be held in the same year. The movement's policies for these elections were: Building a "Europe of Homelands" through annulling the Lisbon Treaty, furthering the anti-gender campaign, promoting Polish historical policy at the EU level, striving for the rights of Poles abroad (especially in Lithuania), withdrawal from the climate package, and promoting Polish mining and coal-based energy. The National Movement fielded candidates in all constituencies. In the elections 98,626 people voted for the National Movement, which gave it 1.4% of the vote (9th place overall).

Senate by-elections in 2014
In the by-election to district No. 47 of the Senate on September 7, 2014, the candidate of the National Movement, Krzysztof Bosak, received 6.42% of votes, which placed him in 3rd place out of 6 candidates.

Presidential elections in 2015
In the Polish presidential election in 2015 the party fielded a candidate, Marian Kowalski, a columnist and bodybuilder. He was eliminated in the first-round with only 77,630 votes, a 0.52% share.

Parliamentary elections 2015
In the  2015 parliamentary election the RN cooperated with Kukiz'15, whose five of 42 seats were held by National Movement members. In April 2016 National Movement management decided to leave Kukiz's movement, but only one MP followed party instruction. Those who stayed in Kukiz'15  formed association "National Democracy" (Endecja) along with a few other Kukiz'15 MPs.

 Elections to the European Parliament in 2019 
In the 2019 National Movement has created an anti-European Union coalition called Konfederacja Korwin Liroy Braun Narodowcy. The coalition got 621,188 votes (4.55%).

 Parliamentary elections 2019
For the 2019 elections the National Movement continued to be part of the Confederation and the coalition was one of only five electoral committees with candidates in all electoral districts. This time they made it into the Sejm with 6.81% of the vote. The coalition got 11 MPs, of which 5 belong to the National Movement.

Presidential elections in 2020
For the upcoming Polish presidential election in 2020 the Confederation had a primary. Vice-chairman Krzysztof Bosak ran in the primary as the candidate for the National Movement. He won the primary and was nominated by the Confederation on January 18.

 Election results 
 Sejm 

 Presidential 

References

Sources
Tokarz, Grzegorz (2002). Ruch narodowy w Polsce w latach 1989-1997''. Wydawnictwo Uniwersytetu Wrocławskiego

2012 establishments in Poland
Anti-communism in Poland
Anti-communist parties
Anti-globalization political parties
Catholic political parties
Catholicism and far-right politics
Eurosceptic parties in Poland
Far-right political parties in Poland
Militarism
National conservative parties
National Democracy
Nationalist parties in Poland
Organizations that oppose LGBT rights
Islamophobia in Europe
Anti-Islam sentiment in Poland
Polish nationalism
Polish nationalist parties
Political parties established in 2012
Political parties in Poland
Social conservative parties
Confederation Liberty and Independence